The Social Democracy Party of Albania is a social-democratic Albanian political party.  It was established in 2003. In the July 2005 elections it won two seats in Parliament. Its leader is Paskal Milo.

At the 2009 elections it won 0.68 percent. It won 2,473 votes (0.16%) in the 2017 elections.

References

2003 establishments in Albania
Political parties established in 2003
Political parties in Albania
Social democratic parties in Albania